Khalid Tadmine (born 7 February 1995) is a Dutch footballer of Moroccan descent who plays for Koninklijke HFC in the Dutch Tweede Divisie.

Club career
He made his professional debut in the Eerste Divisie for Almere City FC on 14 September 2012 in a game against SC Cambuur.

References

External links
 

1995 births
Footballers from Amsterdam
Dutch sportspeople of Moroccan descent
Living people
Dutch footballers
Almere City FC players
Eerste Divisie players
Tweede Divisie players
Association football wingers
Koninklijke HFC players